Pierre Prévost (7 December 1764 – 30 August 1823) was the first French panorama painter.

Born in the city of Montigny-le-Gannelon, he was a student of Pierre-Henri de Valenciennes. He died in Paris and is buried there in the Père Lachaise Cemetery.

Panoramas

 View of Paris from the Tuileries, with the help of Constant Bourgeois, Denis Fontaine and Jean Mouchet
 The evacuation of Toulon by English in 1793
 Panorama of Lyon
 View of Amsterdam
 Panorama of Rome
 Panorama of Naples
 Fleet at Boulogne preparing to invade England
 View of the meeting between French and Russian Emperors at Tilsitt
 Battle of Wagram
 Panorama of Jerusalem
 Panorama of Athens
 A Panoramic View of London, from the Tower of St. Margaret's Church, Westminster, acquired by the Museum of London in July 2018.

References 

 Michaud et Michaud, Biographie universelle, ancienne et moderne, t. 36, Paris, L. G. Michaud, pp. 60–2.
 Louis du Chalard & Antoine Gautier, « Les panoramas orientaux du peintre Pierre Prévost (1764-1823) », in Orients, Bulletin de l'association des anciens élèves et amis des langues orientales, juin 2010, pp. 85–108.
 Louis du Chalard & Antoine Gautier, « Le Panorama de Constantinople, anonyme 20 828 du musée du Louvre, dévoile une partie de ses secrets », in Orients, Bulletin de l'association des anciens élèves et amis des langues orientales, juin 2011, p. 95-98. 
 Bernard Comment, Le XIXe siècle des panoramas, essai, Adam Biro, 1993, pp. 18-22.
 Bernard Comment, The painted panoramas, New-York, 1999, pp. 29–46.
 Les hommes illustres de l'Orléanais, 1852.
 Jean Prévost, Notice historique sur Montigny-le-Gannelon, Châteaudun, 1852.
 John Gorton, General Biographical Dictionary'', 1833, volume II.
 Dictionnaire général des lettres des beaux-arts et des sciences, Théodore Bachelet, 1862, vol. II, p. 1364.
 Biografia degli artisti, 1836.

External links

 Panorama de Constantinople, Collections, Louvre

1764 births
People from Eure-et-Loir
1823 deaths
18th-century French painters
19th-century French painters
French male painters
Burials at Père Lachaise Cemetery
19th-century French male artists
18th-century French male artists